Midnight Believer is the twenty-fifth studio blues album by B.B. King, released in 1978 on ABC Records. The album reached No. 27 on the Billboard Top Soul Albums chart.

Overview
Midnight Believer was produced by Stewart Levine. Artists including Roland Bautista and The Crusaders also appeared on the album.

Singles
A song from the album called "Never Make A Move Too Soon" reached No. 19 on the Billboard Hot Soul Songs chart.

Track listing
All tracks by Will Jennings and Joe Sample, except where noted.

 "When It All Comes Down (I'll Still Be Around)" - 4:11
 "Midnight Believer" - 4:59
 "I Just Can't Leave Your Love Alone" - 4:18
 "Hold On (I Feel Our Love Is Changing)" - 4:10
 "Never Make a Move Too Soon" (Stix Hooper, Jennings) - 5:29
 "A World Full of Strangers" - 4:23
 "Let Me Make You Cry a Little Longer" - 5:49

Personnel
B.B. King – guitar, vocals
Robert Popwell – bass guitar
Joe Sample – keyboards
Stix Hooper – drums, percussion
Roland Bautista – rhythm guitar
James Gadson – drums
Wilton Felder – bass guitar, tenor saxophone

References

B.B. King albums
1978 albums
Albums produced by Stewart Levine
ABC Records albums